Richard Bacon's Beer & Pizza Club is a British comedy panel show produced by Talkback Thames for ITV4. The programme is presented by Richard Bacon. The programme has aired two series.

Overview
Each week, Bacon is joined by three celebrity guests who discuss various issues whilst free to drink beer and eat pizza. Each guest also asks a big question to the others and the person who gives the best answer is declared the winner of that round.

Episode list

Series 1

Series 2

References

External links

2010s British comedy television series
2010 British television series debuts
2011 British television series endings
ITV comedy
Television series by Fremantle (company)
English-language television shows